The Blue Mountain Eagle is a weekly newspaper published on Wednesdays in John Day, Oregon.  It was established in 1868, and has undergone a long string of mergers in the decades since. It has a circulation of 2,491.

The Eagle was acquired by the East Oregonian Publishing Company in 1979. It began an online edition in 2000.

Editor Scotta Callister left the paper in 2015 to become part-owner and interim publisher of the Malheur Enterprise, which had great success under her leadership and that of her husband, Les Zaitz. Publisher Marissa Williams left in 2018 after 14 years with the company, with Kathryn Brown taking over as interim publisher. During Williams' tenure, the Eagle's coverage of Aryan Nation's failed effort to establish a headquarters in Grant County earned a Pulitzer Prize nomination.

References

External links 
Official website

1898 establishments in Oregon
Newspapers published in Oregon
Oregon Newspaper Publishers Association
Publications established in 1898
John Day, Oregon